Douglas Leroy Rayes (born August 22, 1952) is a United States district judge of the United States District Court for the District of Arizona.

Biography

Rayes received a Bachelor of Science in Engineering degree, summa cum laude, in 1975 from Arizona State University. He received a Juris Doctor, cum laude, in 1978 from the Arizona State University College of Law. He served in the Army Judge Advocate General's Corps, from 1979 to 1982. From 1982 to 1984, he was an associate at the law firm of McGroder, Pearlstein, Pepler & Tryon. From 1984 to 2000, he was a partner at that law firm which was named Tryon, Heller & Rayes at the time of his departure. From 2000 to 2014, he served as a Judge of the Maricopa County Superior Court. During his tenure on the bench, he presided over a wide range of cases, including civil, criminal and family law matters.

Consideration for Arizona Supreme Court

In August 2012, Rayes was one of three finalists recommended to Governor Jan Brewer to fill a vacancy on the Arizona Supreme Court. Brewer ultimately appointed Ann Scott Timmer to the court.

Federal judicial service

On September 19, 2013, President Barack Obama nominated Rayes to serve as a United States District Judge of the United States District Court for the District of Arizona, to the seat vacated by Judge Frederick J. Martone, who assumed senior status on January 30, 2013. Rayes, a Republican, was one of four Arizona judicial nominees announced by Obama that day who were chosen in consultation with Republican Senators John McCain and Jeff Flake. On February 27, 2014 his nomination was reported out of the committee. On May 13, 2014, Senate Majority Leader Harry Reid filed for cloture on his nomination. On May 15, 2014, The Senate voted 59–35 to invoke cloture on his nomination. Later that same day, the Senate confirmed him by a 77–19 vote. He received his judicial commission on May 28, 2014.

References

External links

1952 births
Living people
Arizona lawyers
Arizona state court judges
Judges of the United States District Court for the District of Arizona
People from Globe, Arizona
Sandra Day O'Connor College of Law alumni
Superior court judges in the United States
United States Army reservists
United States district court judges appointed by Barack Obama
21st-century American judges